Santa María is a municipality in the Honduran department of La Paz.

Demographics
At the time of the 2013 Honduras census, Santa María municipality had a population of 10,812. Of these, 97.14% were Indigenous (96.98% Lenca), 2.62% Mestizo, 0.20% Black or Afro-Honduran and 0.04% White.

References

Municipalities of the La Paz Department (Honduras)